Scythris kailai is a moth of the family Scythrididae. It was described by Bengt Å. Bengtsson in 1997. It is found in Kazakhstan.

References

kailai
Moths described in 1997